Dadokome was a town of ancient Bithynia, inhabited in Roman times. 

Its site is located near Köroğluderbend, Asiatic Turkey.

References

Populated places in Bithynia
Former populated places in Turkey
Roman towns and cities in Turkey
History of Bolu Province